"The Floral Dance" is an English song describing the annual Furry Dance in Helston, Cornwall.

The music and lyrics were written in 1911 by Kate Emily Barkley ("Katie") Moss (1881–1947) who was a professional violinist, pianist and concert singer. She was brought up in London and studied at the Royal Academy of Music.

The song tells the story of an incident that apparently actually happened to Moss herself on a visit to Helston during the springtime 'Furry Dance' celebrations and the song was reportedly written directly afterwards as she was going home on the train.

The songbook cover states that the music was "founded on an old Cornish air". Moss introduces the original Furry Dance tune in the piano part just as the singer is describing the sound of the band, with its "cornet, clarinet and big trombone; fiddle, cello, big bass drum; bassoon, flute and euphonium". 

"The Floral Dance" was first recorded in 1912 by the Australian bass/baritone Peter Dawson, and many other versions have appeared since. Frederick Ranalow's recording was made in order to cash in on the sales of the Dawson version. The 1960s saw versions by The Eagles (UK), Ken Sims' Vintage Jazz Band (UK) and The Ivy League (UK). In 1970, the cast of Dad's Army performed a sketch ('The Cornish Floral Dance') for Christmas Night with the Stars. They repeated their versions in the 1975 Royal Variety Performance at the London Palladium.

Moss's song experienced a revival in an arrangement for the Brighouse and Rastrick Brass Band by their MD Derek Broadbent, which sold half a million copies, and reached No. 2 in the UK Singles Chart by Christmas 1977.  In 1978, Terry Wogan recorded a version which reached No. 21 in the same chart. Wogan's version was accompanied by the Hanwell Band from west London, and omitted the final verse containing the climax to the story. On Top of the Pops, Wogan sang it live to a backing track. An instrumental version was recorded in 1979 by Gheorghe Zamfir. A version of the song was prominently featured near the beginning of the 1996 film, Brassed Off.

In 2016, a campaign for Christmas Number One was launched for Terry Wogan's version of "The Floral Dance" after his death. All proceeds of the downloaded single were to be given to Children in Need.

Lyric
Music and lyrics by Katie Moss, 1911

As I walked home on a Summer night
When stars in Heav'n were shining bright
Far away from the footlight's glare
Into the sweet and scented air
Of a quaint old Cornish town

Borne from afar on the gentle breeze
Joining the murmur of the summer seas
Distant tones of an old world dance
Played by the village band perchance
On the calm air came floating down

I thought I could hear the curious tone
Of the cornet, clarinet and big trombone
Fiddle, 'cello, big bass drum
Bassoon, flute and euphonium
Far away, as in a trance
I heard the sound of the Floral Dance

And soon I heard such a bustling and prancing
And then I saw the whole village was dancing
In and out of the houses they came
Old folk, young folk, all the same
In that quaint old Cornish town

Every boy took a girl 'round the waist
And hurried her off in tremendous haste
Whether they knew one another I care not
Whether they cared at all, I know not
But they kissed as they danced along.

And there was the band with that curious tone
Of the cornet, clarinet and big trombone
Fiddle, 'cello, big bass drum
Bassoon, flute and euphonium
Each one making the most of his chance
All together in the Floral Dance

I felt so lonely standing there
And I could only stand and stare
For I had no boy with me
Lonely I should have to be
In that quaint old Cornish town.

When suddenly hast'ning down the lane
A figure I knew I saw quite plain
With outstretched hands he came along
And carried me into that merry throng
And fiddle and all went dancing down.

We danced to the band with the curious tone
Of the cornet, clarinet and big trombone
Fiddle, 'cello, big bass drum
Bassoon, flute and euphonium
Each one making the most of his chance
Altogether in the Floral Dance.

Dancing here, prancing there
Jigging, jogging ev'rywhere
Up and down, and round the town
Hurrah! For the Cornish Floral Dance

References

External links

Musicweb British Light Music Composers
Helston Flora Day by Ian Marshall

1911 songs
Cornish music
Songs about musical instruments
Songs about dancing